John Boyd Thacher (September 11, 1847 – February 25, 1909) was the Mayor of Albany, New York and New York State Senator as well as an American manufacturer, writer, and book collector.  He was the son of Albany mayor, George Thacher, and the uncle of Albany mayor, John Boyd Thacher II.

Thacher was born in Ballston, New York, graduated from Williams College in 1869 and settled in Albany, New York.  He became an active scholar in writing after college and also became active in his father's business, the Thacher Car Wheel Works, which was one of the leading industries in Albany.  When his father died in 1887, John and his brother George became proprietors of the business.
Thacher and his wife, Emma Treadwell Thacher, had no children. Thacher was the uncle of Ebby Thacher, who was regarded as the man who brought Bill Wilson, founder of Alcoholics Anonymous, into the Oxford Group, which was the model for the later fellowship for alcoholics.
In 1914, Thacher's widow, Emma Treadwell Thacher, gave 350 acres of land on the Helderberg escarpment, where the couple had had their summer home, to the state of New York; the scenic park, rich with fossils and caves, is now called John Boyd Thacher State Park 2..

Politics
Thacher was a member of the New York State Senate (17th D.) in 1884 and 1885. Then he was elected Mayor of Albany, serving from May 4, 1886, to April 20, 1888. In 1890, President of the United States Benjamin Harrison appointed Thacher to be a member of the World's Columbian Exposition.  Several years later, Thacher was elected Mayor of Albany again, serving from January 1, 1896, to December 31, 1897.

Writing
An authority on U.S. history, Thacher's publications include: 
 The Continent of America, Its Discovery and Its Baptism; An Essay on the Nomenclature of the Old Continents, etc. (1896)
 A drama, Charlecote: or the Trial of William Shakespeare (1896)
 The Cabotian Discovery (1897)
 Christopher Columbus, His Life, His Works, His Remains, together with an Essay on Peter Martyr of Anghera and Bartolomé de las Casas, the first Historians of America (two volumes, 1903)
 Outlines of the French Revolution told in Autographs'' (1905)

The French Revolution autograph publication highlighted Thacher's extensive collection of autographs which also included those of every signer of the United States Declaration of Independence.

Thacher purchased a large plot of land in central Albany County, New York which his widow, Emma Treadwell Thacher, donated to the state in 1914, and is now known as John Boyd Thacher State Park.

John Boyd Thacher is interred in Albany Rural Cemetery.

References

2. https://altamontenterprise.com/opinion/columns/glimpse-guilderland-history/06172022/john-boyd-thacher-was-state-senator-mayor

External links
Notable people
Hudson-Mohawk Genealogical and Family Memoirs: Thacher
The John Boyd Thacher Collection in the Rare Book and Special Collections Division at the Library of Congress contains incunabula, early Americana, material pertaining to the French Revoluaton and authographs.

 

1847 births
1909 deaths
New York (state) state senators
Mayors of Albany, New York
Historians from New York (state)
Burials at Albany Rural Cemetery
19th-century American politicians